Rabbalshede is a locality situated in Tanum Municipality, Västra Götaland County, Sweden with 275 inhabitants in 2010.

References 

Populated places in Västra Götaland County
Populated places in Tanum Municipality